Thomas Bridger (24 June 1934 – 30 July 1991) was a British racing driver from England. He participated in one Formula One World Championship Grand Prix, on 19 October 1958, scoring no championship points. His greatest success came in Formula Three, where he won 15 races.

Career

Born in Woolmer Green, Hertfordshire, Bridger started racing in Formula Three in 1953, initially competing minor events in a Kieft-Norton before moving to a Cooper to compete full-time in Formula Three in 1957. He achieved some success racing with Jim Russell, one of the more successful drivers in the category. He moved up to Formula Two in 1958, finishing second in the Crystal Palace Trophy race, and eighth in the Coupe de Vitesse at Reims.

Bridger raced in the 1958 Moroccan Grand Prix with British Racing Partnership, driving a Formula Two-class Cooper T45. He qualified in 22nd place, and Bridger got up to 14th before his race was ended by a collision on lap 30. The crash involved three vehicles, but Bridger emerged unharmed.

He returned to Formula Three in 1959 with the Cooper-Norton car, winning four races throughout the year. In 1960, he raced in Formula Junior, competing in a works Lotus at the British Grand Prix.

Bridger died at Logie Coldstone, Aberdeenshire in 1991 at the age of 57 years.

Racing record

Complete Formula One World Championship results
(key)

Complete British Saloon Car Championship results
(key) (Races in bold indicate pole position; races in italics indicate fastest lap.)

† Events with 2 races staged for the different classes.

‡ Event with 3 races staged for the different classes.

References 

1934 births
People from Welwyn Hatfield (district)
1991 deaths
English racing drivers
English Formula One drivers
British Racing Partnership Formula One drivers
24 Hours of Le Mans drivers
World Sportscar Championship drivers